Fingal Ravens is a Gaelic Athletic Association club based in Rolestown, County Dublin, Ireland. Fingal Ravens won the 2007 Dublin Intermediate Football Championship and are therefore in the Senior championship for 2008.  
The Senior team won the Dublin Intermediate Football Championship in 2007 and booked a place in the Leinster Intermediate Semi Final against Suncroft. The Senior team won the Lenister Intermediate Semi Final on Sunday 25 November 2007 against Suncroft of Kildare.  They eventually went on to the final against neighbours and local rivals Donaghmore/Ashbourne. It proved an interesting game because the Fingal Ravens manager Mick Deegan was a resident of Ashbourne in County Meath. Ravens won the IFC title with a goal to spare in Parnell Park on Sunday 9 December 2007. Fingal then went on to the All-Ireland Intermediate Club Football Championship semi final against Ballinagh of Cavan. Ravens won the semi against Ballinagh by 0-11 to 0-08 to seal their place in the 2008 all-Ireland intermediate club final.

Fingal Ravens went on to play the All Ireland Intermediate Club Football Championship Final in Croke Park, but didn't come home All Ireland Champions.

With all this success, 2007–2008 was the greatest in the club's history to date.

Ravens then went on to win AFL Division 2 in November 2008 and also securing promotion to Division 1.

Roll of honour
 All-Ireland Intermediate Club Football Championship: Runners-Up 2008
 Leinster Intermediate Club Football Championship: Winners 2007-08
 Dublin Intermediate Football Championship: Winners 2007
 Dublin Junior Football Championship: Winners 1969, 1999
 Dublin Junior B Football Championship: Winners 2007
 Dublin Minor B Football Championship: Winners 2004
 Dublin Minor C Football Championship: Winners 2011
 Dublin AFL Division 2: Winners 2008, 2014

Notable players

Darren Daly

References

External links 
 Dublin Club GAA
 Dublin GAA
 Fingal Ravens Official Website 

Gaelic games clubs in Fingal
Gaelic football clubs in Fingal